Stronger or The Stronger may refer to:

Music

Albums
Stronger (Agnes album), 2006
Stronger (Carlene Carter album) or the title song, 2008
Stronger (Cliff Richard album), 1989
Stronger (Dead by April album) or the title song (see below), 2011
Stronger (Fantan Mojah album), or the title song, 2008
Stronger (Hanna Pakarinen album), 2005
Stronger (Kate Earl album) or the title song, 2012
Stronger (Kate Ryan album), 2004
Stronger (Kelly Clarkson album) or the title song (see below), 2011
Stronger (Kristine W album) or the title song, 2000
Stronger (Myron Butler & Levi album) or the title song, 2007
Stronger (Natalie Grant album), 2001
Stronger (Sanna Nielsen album), 2008
Stronger (Sara Evans album), 2011
 Stronger (Tank album) or the title song, 2014
Stronger with Each Tear (working title:  Stronger), by Mary J. Blige, or the title song (see below), 2009
Stronger, by Jan Werner Danielsen, 2006

Songs
 "Stronger" (Ai song), 2010
 "Stronger" (Britney Spears song), 2000
 "Stronger" (Clean Bandit song), 2015
 "Stronger" (Gary Barlow song), 1999
 "Stronger" (Kanye West song), 2007
 "Stronger" (Mandisa song), 2011
 "Stronger" (Mary J. Blige song), 2009
 "Stronger" (Sam Feldt song), 2021
 "Stronger" (Sugababes song), 2002
 "Stronger (What Doesn't Kill You)", by Kelly Clarkson, 2012
 "Stronger", by Arty from Glorious, 2015
 "Stronger", by Boyzone from Brother, 2010
 "Stronger", by Danzel, 2015
 "Stronger", by Exo from Ex'Act, 2016
 "Stronger", by Dead by April from Dead by April, 2009
 "Stronger", by Hillsong Church from This Is Our God, 2008
 "Stronger", by Inez, 2006
 "Stronger", by Jennette McCurdy from Not That Far Away, 2010
 "Stronger", by Lamb from Between Darkness and Wonder, 2003
 "Stronger", by Mavis Staples from We Get By, 2019
 "Stronger", by Megan McKenna, 2019
 "Stronger", by NCT Dream from We Boom, 2019
 "Stronger", by Slapshock from Cariño Brutal, 2009
 "Stronger", by Taxiride from Garage Mahal, 2002
 "Stronger", by Through Fire, 2016
 "Stronger", by Trust Company from True Parallels, 2005
 "Stronger", by Twice from &Twice, 2019
 "Stronger", by Will Young from Friday's Child, 2003
 "Stronger", by WJSN from Sequence, 2022

Theatre and film
 The Stronger, an 1889 play by August Strindberg
 The Stronger (opera), a 1952 opera by Hugo Weisgall, based on the play
 Stronger, a film shown at the 2004 Toronto International Film Festival
 Stronger, a 2011 American short film featuring Darryl Stephens
 Stronger (film), a 2017 American film directed by David Gordon Green
 The Stronger, a 2007 short film directed by Lia Williams

Literature
Stronger, an unpublished autobiography by Jamelia

See also
"Harder, Better, Faster, Stronger", a song by Daft Punk, sampled in the Kanye West song "Stronger"
Kamen Rider Stronger, a Japanese television series
Strong (disambiguation)
Strength (disambiguation)